IRIB Iran Kala (Iran goods channel) is a national TV channel in Iran which was launched on March 3, 2018. This channel is available in most provinces and could be received using Set-top box devices, or Satellite televisions.

Targets
This channel has 7 main purposes. Including following objects:
Introducing stuffs
Economical news
Selling stuffs directly
Educational programs about trading
Advertisement

See also 
 Islamic Republic of Iran Broadcasting

External links

Television stations in Iran